Vyacheslav "Slava" Shabranskyy (born 1 May 1987) is a Ukrainian professional boxer who challenged for the WBO light-heavyweight title in 2017.

Amateur career
Vyacheslav Shabranskyy competed in the World Series of Boxing competition as a member of the Matadores team. In that competition he defeated future Irish Olympian and Silver Medalist Kenneth Egan.

Professional career
Vyacheslav Shabranskyy made his professional debut in 2012, winning via first-round knockout against Bryan McGlory. He is signed with American boxing promoters Golden Boy Promotions.
Shabrankskyy holds notable wins over Yunieski Gonzalez, Paul Parker and Derrick Findley.

Professional boxing record

References

External links

1987 births
Living people
Light-heavyweight boxers
Ukrainian male boxers
Ukrainian expatriate sportspeople in the United States
Sportspeople from Zhytomyr